Duldurginsky District is an administrative and municipal district (raion) of Agin-Buryat Okrug of Zabaykalsky Krai, Russia, one of the thirty-one in the krai. It is located in the south of the krai, and borders with Chitinsky District in the north, Aginsky District in the east, Akshinsky District in the south, and with Ulyotovsky District in the west. Its administrative center is the rural locality (a selo) of Duldurga. Population:  15,316 (2002 Census);  The population of Duldurga accounts for 43.3% of the district's total population.

Geography
The Khentei-Daur Highlands rise at the southwestern end of the district.

History
The district was established on January 16, 1941.

References

Notes

Sources



Districts of Zabaykalsky Krai
States and territories established in 1941